Allmendingen is a municipality in the Alb-Donau district, in Baden-Württemberg, Germany.

Geography
The highest point on the Lutheran mountains (Ennahofen) is 750 meters above sea level. NN.

Neighboring communities
The municipality is bordered to the north to Schelklingen, in the east to Altheim, in the south and west to Ehingen (Donau).

Municipality arrangement
The municipality Allmendingen consists of the  locations Allmendingen (3304 inhabitants on 30 April 2009), Ennahofen (266 inhabitants), Grötzingen (296 inhabitants), Niederhofen (375 inhabitants) and Weilersteußlingen (249 inhabitants).

History
Earliest evidence of human habitation is the discovery of a brick kiln dating back to the Roman occupation in the district Niederhofen.

Population Development
There are numbers of inhabitants after the respective area of jurisdiction. The figures are census results (¹) or official updates of the Statistical Office of Baden-Württemberg.

Politics
The council Allmendingen has after the last elections 20 members. The local elections on 25 May 2014 led to the following official results. The turnout was 58.5%. The council consists of the elected honorary councilors and the mayor as chairman. The mayor is entitled to vote in the municipal council.
Party and seats:	
CDU – 49.7% = 10 seats	
Free voters – 50.3% = 10 seats

Crest
Blazon : In silver under a blue shield head, within three gold balls (loaves), a black, upright horse with a red tongue.
The coat of arms combines elements of the coat of arms of the lords of Freyberg (balls), whose history is closely linked to the Allmendingen, and the bourgeois family Renner (horse), which also had possessions in Allmendingen.

Economics

Transportation
Allmendingen is located on the Ulm–Sigmaringen railway and is a regional train stop. There are  hourly rail connections to Ehingen (Donau) and Ulm. Allmendingen is incorporated in the Donau-Iller-Nahverkehrsverbund.
The community is located at the national road B 492 Ehingen-Blaubeuren.

Established businesses
The largest employer is the automotive Burgmaier. Other industrial companies are the form manufacturers Rampf, as well as the cement plant Schwenk.

Leisure and sports facilities
Allmendingen has an outdoor pool. There is also a tennis court, a gymnastics and sports hall and the football stadium of the TSV Allmendingen.

Community development

Incorporations
On 1 January 1974, the previously independent municipalities Ennahofen, Grötzingen, Niederhofen and Weilersteußlingen were incorporated.

Renovation of the center
The municipality Allmendingen leads since 2000 through a restructuring of their village. Within the rehabilitation section I the old school house, built in 1885, was transformed into a community center. The following public construction phases were realized:
 Northern main road (2001/2002)
 Church Square (2003)
 Southern Main Road (2004)
 Design of the town square (2006)

Points of interest

Buildings
 Parish Church of St. Mary of the Assumption of the 15th century
 Castle of the Barons von Freyberg, 16th century. Since hundreds of years, the barons of Freyberg-Eisenberg are resident in Allmendingen.  
 Old castle
 New castle

Notable people
 Joseph von Sontheimer (1787–1846), Royal Württembergian master doctor, translator of Arabian medicinals recipe of Avicenna
 Albrecht von Freyberg (1876–1943), marine officer, vice-admiral of the Reichsmarine
 Helmut Braig (1923–2013), painter, sculptor, author
 Ernst Geprägs (1929–2011), born in Grötzingen, farmer, vice-president of German farmer association

References

Alb-Donau-Kreis
Württemberg